The Fimiston Open Pit, colloquially known as the Super Pit, was Australia's largest open cut gold mine until 2016 when it was surpassed by the Newmont Boddington gold mine also in Western Australia. The Super Pit is located off the Goldfields Highway on the south-east edge of Kalgoorlie, Western Australia. The pit is oblong in plan view and is approximately 3.5 kilometres long, 1.5 kilometres wide and over 600 metres deep.

The Fimiston Open Pit is owned by Northern Star Resources. The mine produced  of gold in 2019, and employs around 1,100 employees and contractors directly on site.

Earlier stages 
Originally consisting of a large number of underground mines, including the Paringa, Oroya, Brown Hill, Chaffers, and Hainault mines, consolidation into a single open pit mine was first attempted by Alan Bond, but he was unable to complete the task. The Fimiston Open Pit was eventually created in 1989 by Kalgoorlie Consolidated Gold Mines, a 50:50 corporate joint venture between Homestake Gold of Australia and Gold Mines of Kalgoorlie (a Normandy Mining subsidiary).

Barrick Gold acquired its share of the mine in December 2001, when it took over Homestake Mining Company. Newmont became part-owner of the mine three months later, when it acquired Normandy Mining in February 2002. Saracen Mineral Holdings Limited acquired its share of the mine on 28 November 2019, when it purchased Barrick Gold's 50% stake. Northern Star Resources acquired its share of the mine on 3 January 2020, when it purchased Newmont's 50% stake.

Geology 
Most of the gold mined in the Fimiston Open Pit occurs within ore lodes formed by ancient shears in a rock unit called the Golden Mile Dolerite. The gold mining area of Kalgoorlie-Boulder-Fimiston has long been called the Golden Mile because of the geographical concentration of rich mines in that area, even though the lodes occur in an area over 2 km in length and 1 km in depth.

Production 
Mining is via conventional drill and blast mining via face shovels and dump trucks. Around 15 million tonnes of rock are moved in any given year, consisting primarily of waste rock.

Gold within the Golden Mile lode system is unusual in that it is present as telluride minerals within pyrite. In order to recover the gold, the ore must be crushed, passed through a gravity circuit to recover the free gold present in some of the higher-grade lodes, and then subjected to flotation to produce an auriferous pyrite-telluride concentrate.  The concentrate is then treated at an IsaMill Ultra Fine Grinding (UFG) mill at Fimiston and then cyanidised, or trucked to the Gidji Processing Plant, 20 kilometres north of Kalgoorlie. At Gidji, the concentrate is treated in ultrafine grinding (UFG) mills, and then subjected to cyanide extraction of gold.

Prior to the installation of the UFG mills, concentrate was treated at Gidji in two circulating fluid bed roasters. Roasting ceased in 2015.

Figures
Past production figures were:

References

Bibliography

External links 

 
 MINEDEX website: Golden Mile / KCGM Database of the Department of Mines, Industry Regulation and Safety

Barrick Gold
City of Kalgoorlie–Boulder
Gold mines in Western Australia
Newmont
Open-pit mines
Surface mines in Australia
Tourist attractions in Western Australia